Mind Universe (stylized as mind Universe) is the sixth studio album by Japanese singer Shizuka Kudo. It was released on March 6, 1991, through Pony Canyon. It features the single "Boya Boya Dekinai". The album was re-released in APO-CD format on December 1, 1993. Mind Universe became Kudo's fourth number-one album and her last record to top the Oricon Albums Chart.

Commercial performance
Mind Universe debuted at number one on the Oricon Albums Chart, with 112,000 units sold in its first week. The album fell to number three the following week, with 39,000 copies sold. Mind Universe dropped to number twelve next, where it stayed for two straight weeks, selling 23,000 and 19,000 copies, respectively. It stayed in the top twenty for one last week, coming in at number 15 with sales of 16,000 copies, before dropping down to number 27 on its sixth charting week. The album charted in the top 100 for eleven consecutive weeks, selling a reported total of 247,000 copies during its run. It was ranked number 69 on the year-end Oricon Albums Chart.

Track listing
All tracks composed and arranged by Tsugutoshi Gotō.

Charts

Certification

Release history

See also
 List of Oricon number-one albums

References

1991 albums
Shizuka Kudo albums
Pony Canyon albums